The 2020 Dixie State Trailblazers football team represented Dixie State University (now Utah Tech University) in the 2020–21 NCAA Division I FCS football season as an independent. They were led by second-year head coach Paul Peterson and played their home games at Greater Zion Stadium in St. George, Utah. Due to the NCAA's transition rules, they were not eligible for the 2020 FCS Playoffs.

Previous season

The Trailblazers finished the 2019 season 8–3 overall and 7–3 in Rocky Mountain Athletic Conference (RMAC) play to place third.

Schedule
Dixie State had a game scheduled against Drake, which was canceled due to the COVID-19 pandemic.

References

Dixie State
Utah Tech Trailblazers football seasons
Dixie State Football